Myebon Township is a township of Mrauk-U District in the Rakhine State of Burma (Myanmar). The principal town is Myebon. In October 2010, much of the township was devastated by Cyclone Giri. Some villages were destroyed by the storm and thousands of people were left homeless.

Notes

External links
 "Myebon Township - Rakhine State" map ID: MIMU154v01, created: 11 August 2010, Myanmar Information Management Unit (MIMU)
 "Myebon Google Satellite Map" Maplandia World Gazetteer

Townships of Rakhine State